West Valley School District (WVSD) is located in the city of Spokane Valley, Washington. The District has five elementary schools, two middle schools, and Three high schools, which include two non-traditional high schools. The grade configurations are K-5 in the elementary, 6–8 in the middle schools, and 9–12 in the high schools.

History

The West Valley School District was established in 1910 when several smaller districts were combined to form one.

Schools
West Valley School District has total of 12 schools.

High schools

Middle schools

Elementary schools

Special Programs

References

External links

School districts in Washington (state)
Public school districts in Spokane County, Washington
School districts established in 1910
1910 establishments in Washington (state)